Balmaceda Airport  is an airport next to the village of Balmaceda, serving the Aysén Region of Chile.

The Balmaceda non-directional beacon (Ident: BAL) is located on the field.

Expansion plans

In 2016 works to improve the airfield and expand capacity were commenced consisting of resurfacing the damaged runway surface, the building of a new 30 m wide parallel taxiway, a new control tower, expansion of the apron, and improvements to other administrative structures. These were made with an investment of approximately 27 billion pesos, much of which were national funds intended for the development of remote regions of the country.

In April 2018 the new taxiway entered use as a temporary runway (designated 09L/27R) to enable repair works on the main runway.

Airlines and destinations

Accidents and incidents
On 8 April 1968, Douglas C-49K CC-CBM of LADECO crashed on approach, killing all 36 people on board. The aircraft was operating a domestic scheduled passenger flight from Los Cerrillos Airport, Santiago.

See also

Transport in Chile
List of airports in Chile

References

External links
Balmaceda Airport at OpenStreetMap
Balmaceda Airport at OurAirports

Balmaceda Airport at FallingRain

Airports in Aysén Region